The Elder House of Welf (known as Rudolphins in Burgundy) was a Frankish noble dynasty of European rulers documented since the 9th century. Closely related to the Carolingian dynasty, it consisted of a Burgundian and a Swabian group. It has not been definitively clarified, however, whether the two groups formed one dynasty or whether they shared the same name by coincidence only. While the Elder House became extinct in the male line with the death of Duke Welf of Carinthia in 1055, his sister Kunigunde married into the Italian House of Este and became the ancestor of the (Younger) House of Welf.

Origins

According to a family tradition, the ancestry of the Welfs can be traced back to the Skirian prince Edeko (d. 469), a confidant of King Attila the Hun, and to his son Odoacer, King of Italy from 476. Nevertheless, an early ancestor may have been the Frankish nobleman Ruthard (d. before 790), a count in the Argengau and administrator of the Carolingian king Pepin the Younger in Alamannia.

The origin of the name Welf (also Guelph, from ) has not been conclusively established. A late medieval legend first documented in 1475 referred to a (non-historical) Duke Balthazar of Swabia, whose marriage had remained childless and who represented as his own heir and successor Bundus, the newborn son of one of his hunters. When Bundus came of age and was betrothed to a duchess of Guelders, his mother secretly informed him of the circumstances of his birth. The shocked young man waived both the duchess' hand and rule in Swabia. Retired, he spent the rest of his life at the Altdorf monastery. Only on his deathbed did he reveal the truth about his descendance and become known thenceforth as Herzog Wolf (Duke Wolf). Another popular version refers to the eleven (elf) sons of one Count Isenbart of Altdorf, whose mother wanted them to be drowned and years later was faced with those among them who escaped death.

Burgundian group

The older of the two groups was the Burgundian group. When the name first appeared in surviving documents, the family was already at the top of Francia society, with Welf, the first Count of Altdorf, the father-in-law of Emperor Louis the Pious (the son and heir of Charlemagne). He was mentioned in 819 as father of Empress Judith. The younger sons of the first count of Altdorf, Conrad and Rudolf accompanied their sister to the court of her husband, Louis the Pious, where their ambitious spirit maintained their hereditary rank, and where they shared the happy, as well as the adverse fortunes of that sister. When Judith was surprised and confined by her stepsons, her brothers were shaven as monks but claimed and obtained permission to stand beside the throne. Judith's sister Hemma (* 808 † 876) later married Judith's stepson Louis the German and became Queen of the Franks.

Conrad had two sons: Conrad II, who succeeded him; and Hugh, from his church preferment, styled the Abbot. He is traditionally given a third son, Welf I of the Swabian group.

Conrad II succeeded his father as Count of Paris, and recovered the Burgundian estates of his grand-uncle Otkarius. He left an only son Rudolph who assumed the royal crown at the abbey of St Maurice en Valais in 888, who confirmed his independence with two victories over Arnulf, and was then acknowledged emperor in a general diet of the empire. His son, Rudolph II succeeded to this new-formed state, which included the French or western part of Switzerland, Franche-Comté, Savoy, Dauphiné, Provence, and the country between the Rhine and the Alps, and was known as the kingdom of Burgundy. He twice attempted the conquest of Italy, and for a period of three years governed that kingdom.

His son and successor, Conrad III, reigned more than fifty-six years from 937 to 993 and enjoyed the friendship and support of the Saxon emperors. Otto I married his sister Adelaide, who was the mother of Otto II, and the grandmother of Otto III. Conrad was succeeded by his son Rudolph III, surnamed the Lossy. When Rudolph III died childless in 1032 without issue the sovereignty of the kingdom of Burgundy devolved as a fief or legacy to his nephew Conrad of Swabia, who was elected emperor in 1024. With Rudolph, this branch became extinct in the male line.

The last member of the Burgundian group was King Rudolph III of Burgundy, who died childless in 1032.

Notable members of the Burgundian group

 Welf, Count of Altdorf
 Judith, daughter of Welf, Empress
 Rudolph I, King of Burgundy
 Rudolph II, King of Burgundy
 Conrad I, King of Burgundy
 Gisela of Burgundy
 Adelaide of Italy 
 Rudolph III, King of Burgundy

Swabian group
The oldest known member of the Swabian group was Welf I, a count in Swabia who was first mentioned in 842. According to legend, Welf I was a son of Conrad, son of Welf, count of Altdorf, the ancestor of the Burgundian group. This relationship is considered probable because both Conrad and Welf I were counts of Linzgau and Alpgau. The relationship between Welf I and all later members of the Swabian group (Welf, Duke of Carinthia, and his relatives, who were counts of Altdorf) is, again, known only through legend.

The Elder House of Welf became extinct when Welf, Duke of Carinthia, died childless in 1055. The property of the House of Welf was inherited by the elder branch of the House of Este that came to be known as the younger House of Welf, or House of Welf-Este.

Notable members of the Swabian group

 Welf I
 Saint Conrad of Constance
 Welf, Duke of Carinthia (Welf III)

Rulers

References

 Sir Andrew Halliday Annals of the House of Hannover, v.1, London, 1826. at Google Books